St Ignatius Church or the Jesuit Church is a Roman Catholic Church building served by the Society of Jesus next to Coláiste Iognáid in Galway. It was founded in 1863 and is a protected structure in the city.

History

Origins
The Jesuits came to Galway in 1620. In 1645 they built their first school in the area. Throughout the 17th century they were banished and invited back into Galway on numerous occasions. In 1652, they had to leave because of the arrival of Oliver Cromwell's army was in the area. They then returned with the restoration of Charles II in 1660, but were banished again in 1691 by the army of William III, returning finally in 1728.

Foundation
In 1859, the Bishop of Galway, John McEvilly invited the Jesuits to create a college and a church in the area. In 1863, both the church and the college, Coláiste Iognáid, were built. St Ignatius' church was originally a 'service church' or chapel of ease that would serve the local parish church, St Joseph's. In 1971, Bishop Michael Browne asked that the church become a parish church. However, in October 2003, it reverted to being a chapel of ease.

Work

Spirituality
Close to the church is the Jesuit Centre for Spirituality and Culture. It was founded in 2006 and is a non-residential centre that, as well as offering courses, talks and workshops in Ignatian spirituality also hosts conferences and events on Irish and Christian heritage.

Church

The church hosts three Masses on Sundays, and one on Saturday evenings. On the other days in the week, Masses are held in the morning.

School
The church has a close relationship with the school next door, Coláiste Iognáid. The church building is used frequently by the school and a Jesuit from the church always sits on the school's board of management.

See also
 List of Jesuit sites in Ireland
 List of Catholic churches in Ireland

References

External links

 Parish of St Joseph, Galway
 Jesuit Centre for Spirituality and Culture in Galway

Ignatius
Galway, Ignatius
Ignatius
Roman Catholic churches completed in 1863
19th-century Roman Catholic church buildings in Ireland
Galway, Ignatius
19th-century churches in the Republic of Ireland